Leandro Daniel Requena (born 11 September 1987) is an Argentine professional footballer who plays as a goalkeeper for C.D. Cobresal.

Career
Requena had a youth stint with Deportivo Yocsina, before joining Talleres who he began his senior career with in 2006. He made twenty-eight league appearances for the club during his eight-year stay, including appearing in five games in the 2012–13 Torneo Argentino A. While with Talleres, Requena was loaned out on three occasions - twice to Sportivo Patria in the third tier. On 19 August 2013, Requena was loaned to Uruguayan Segunda División side Atenas. He departed midway through the 2013–14 campaign after twelve appearances, with his final match being a 2–1 defeat to Rampla Juniors on 14 December 2013.

Santamarina completed the permanent signing of Requena in January 2015. After participating in forty-five fixtures as Santamarina lost in the promotion play-offs to Patronato, Requena moved across Primera B Nacional with Crucero del Norte in January 2016 before having further stints with Ferro Carril Oeste and Nueva Chicago in the succeeding two years. 2018 saw Requena join Los Andes. He made his debut on 16 September in a home loss to Sarmiento at the Estadio Eduardo Gallardón.

Career statistics
.

Honours
Talleres
Torneo Argentino A: 2012–13

References

External links

1987 births
Living people
Sportspeople from Córdoba Province, Argentina
Argentine footballers
Argentine expatriate footballers
Association football goalkeepers
Torneo Argentino A players
Uruguayan Segunda División players
Torneo Federal A players
Primera Nacional players
Talleres de Córdoba footballers
Sportivo Patria footballers
Atenas de San Carlos players
Club y Biblioteca Ramón Santamarina footballers
Crucero del Norte footballers
Ferro Carril Oeste footballers
Nueva Chicago footballers
Club Atlético Los Andes footballers
Central Córdoba de Santiago del Estero footballers
Cobresal footballers
Argentine expatriate sportspeople in Uruguay
Argentine expatriate sportspeople in Chile
Expatriate footballers in Uruguay
Expatriate footballers in Chile